Arlington is the name of several unincorporated communities in the U.S. state of West Virginia.

Arlington, Harrison County, West Virginia
Arlington, Upshur County, West Virginia